WZKB (94.3 MHz) is an FM radio station broadcasting a Spanish Contemporary format. WZKB is licensed for Wallace, North Carolina.

History
WLSE on 1400 kHz AM, and WLSE-FM on 94.3 MHz, were sister stations, both licensed for Wallace, North Carolina.  WLSE (AM) started broadcasting on May 13, 1953, and broadcast on 1400 kHz.  WLSE-FM started broadcasting on June 20, 1972 and changed its callsign to WZKB on July 14, 1980.

The stations were later purchased later by Mack Jones: They were sold by Richard V. Goines (RVG Broadcasting Inc.) to JG&J Broadcasting Inc., headed by Mack Edmonson Jones, for $230,000; control was handed over on October 23, 1991.  At the time, the AM station was operating with 1 kilowatt of power, and the FM was broadcasting 3 kilowatts.

The license for 1400 WLSE (AM) expired on December 1, 2003 without being renewed.

WZKB was sold to Christian Listening Network in 2003 and became a religious format until 2008 when it was sold to Carolina's Christian Broadcasting, Inc. dba Progress Media. WZKB then became a Spanish religious format for a time, then offered Spanish programming under LMA until late 2011 when WZKB became a simulcast of WTIK La Mega 1310 AM in Durham, North Carolina with a Regional Mexican format. In December 2014, WZKB ended its simulcast agreement with WTIK, and rebranded as Poder 94.3. In May 2015, WZKB rebranded as '''Mía 94.3".

References

External links

1972 establishments in North Carolina
Duplin County, North Carolina
Radio stations established in 1972
ZKB